The men's C-2 500 metres event was an open-style, pairs canoeing event conducted as part of the Canoeing at the 1984 Summer Olympics program.

Medalists

Results

Heats
Eleven teams entered in two heats on August 6. The top three finishers from each of the heats advanced directly to the final and the remaining five teams were relegated to the semifinal.

Semifinal
A semifinal was held on August 8. The top three finishers from the semifinal advanced to the final.

Final
The final was held on August 10.

The Yugoslavs won the gold thanks to a closing spurt that pushed them past the Romanians after 400 m.

References
1984 Summer Olympics official report Volume 2, Part 2. p. 366. 
Sports-reference.com 1984 C-2 500 m results.
Wallechinsky, David and Jaime Loucky (2008). "Canoeing: Men's Canadian Pairs 500 Meters". In The Complete Book of the Olympics: 2008 Edition. London: Aurum Press Limited. p. 481.

Men's C-2 500
Men's events at the 1984 Summer Olympics